On 17 May 2014, an Antonov An-74 transport aircraft of the Lao People's Liberation Army Air Force crashed while en route to Xiangkhouang Province, northern Laos, killing all but one of the 17 people on board. Among the victims were several Laotian politicians travelling to attend a ceremony celebrating the 55th anniversary of the second division of the Lao People's Army.

Accident 
The aircraft was too low on final approach, and its landing gear clipped some trees just short of the runway, resulting in the crash, which was attributed to a technical error.

Aircraft 
The aircraft involved was a Ukrainian-built Antonov An-74TK-300 twinjet, registered as RDPL-34020.

Passengers 
Initial reports suggested that there were fourteen passengers, but later reports gave the figure as twenty on board at the time of the accident, only three were reported to have survived. Once the situation became clearer, the passenger count was given as seventeen and the death toll was given as sixteen, with one survivor after the other two original survivors died from their wounds.

Those killed included:
Douangchay Phichit, Politburo member of Lao People's Revolutionary Party, Deputy Prime Minister and Minister of National Defense
Thongbanh Sengaphone, Secretary of Lao People's Revolutionary Party and minister of Public Security
Cheuang Sombounkhanh, Secretary of Lao People's Revolutionary Party and Head of the Propaganda and Training Commission
Soukanh Mahalath, Secretary of Lao People's Revolutionary Party, Party secretary and Governor of Vientiane

A Thai news source said that the co-pilot, a nurse, and another person had survived. The defence ministry permanent secretary in Thailand said that the Defence Minister of Laos and four others had been killed, and a witness also said that the Defence Minister had died, and gave the figure of fourteen deaths.

Reactions
The death of "arguably the two most powerful people in the security apparatus" was reported to be a significant blow to the ruling Lao People's Revolutionary Party. After the crash, a three-day period of national mourning was announced.

References

Aviation accidents and incidents in Laos
Accidents and incidents involving the Antonov An-74
Xiangkhouang province
Aviation accidents and incidents in 2014
2014 in Laos
May 2014 events in Asia